NGC 535 is a lenticular galaxy in the constellation Cetus. It is estimated to be 222 million light years from the Milky Way and has a diameter of approximately 65,000 light years. The supernova SN 1988ad was observed near these coordinates. NGC 535 was discovered on October 31, 1864, by astronomer Heinrich Ludwig d'Arrest.

See also 
 List of NGC objects (1–1000)

References

External links 
 

Lenticular galaxies
Cetus (constellation)
0535
005282